Hussein Sherif is an Egyptian taekwondo practitioner. Sherif won the bronze medal in the men's finweight (under 54 kg) division at the 2013 World Taekwondo Championships in Puebla.

References

Living people
Egyptian male taekwondo practitioners
Year of birth missing (living people)
World Taekwondo Championships medalists
21st-century Egyptian people